The Philadelphia Quartermaster Depot, now known as the Defense Logistics Agency Troop Support, was founded as the Schuylkill Arsenal in 1799.

History
The Schuylkill Arsenal was built in 1800 to function as a quartermaster and provide the U.S. military with supplies. One of its most famous tasks was outfitting the Lewis and Clark Expedition. It was the third federal facility in the young nation.

The arsenal made clothing and flags for all the military's needs for the next 150 years.

In 1926 the Schuylkill Arsenal was renamed the Philadelphia Quartermaster Depot. The original site at Grays Ferry Avenue and Washington Avenue was closed and the site was razed in 1963. The functions of the Quartermaster Depot were all moved to West Oregon Avenue & South 22nd Street

In 1965 the operation was reorganized into the Defense Personnel Support Center. In 1993 the government closed the textile factory and moved the remaining part of the South Philadelphia operation to the Naval Support Station in Northeast Philadelphia. It was renamed the Defense Supply Center Philadelphia (DSCP) in 1998, and was renamed Defense Logistics Agency Troop Support, or DLA Troop Support, in 2010.

The Philadelphia Quartermaster Depot consists of eleven extant buildings built between 1939 and 1942.  The buildings are of varying heights and sizes, but are consistently clad in tan or brown brick and are in the Art Deco-style.

Placement of this property on the National Register of Historic Places

Philadelphia's application to place the Philadelphia Quartermaster Depot on the National Register of Historic Places was reviewed by the Historic Preservation Board of the Pennsylvania Historical and Museum Commission at its meeting on October 6, 2009, along with applications for: the Hamburg Historic District in Hamburg, Pennsylvania, the Hamnett Historic District in Wilkinsburg, Pennsylvania, the Newville Historic District in Newville, Pennsylvania, the Pennsylvania State Office Building in Philadelphia, the Experimental and Safety Research Coal Mines in Allegheny County's South Park Township, and the Cheney Farm, Hopewell Farm, and Chandler Mill Road Bridge in Chester County.

The Philadelphia Quartermaster Depot was then officially listed on the National Register of Historic Places later in 2010.

See also

Philadelphia Naval Asylum
Defense Logistics Agency
Philadelphia Navy Yard
United States Army Quartermaster Corps

External links
QM Museum

Historic American Buildings Survey documentation:

References

Buildings and structures in Philadelphia
Historic American Buildings Survey in Philadelphia
Military facilities on the National Register of Historic Places in Philadelphia
Art Deco architecture in Pennsylvania
Quartermasters
United States Department of Defense agencies
South Philadelphia